Petrovicky may refer to:

Petrovický, a surname
Petrovičky, a municipality in the Czech Republic